Raya is a given name with multiple, unrelated origins in different cultures.

It is a Bulgarian diminutive of Rayna, meaning happy or a Russian diminutive of Raisa. It might also be related to the Latin name Regina meaning queen.

It is also said to be an Arabic name derived from ريا (raya), meaning perfume or from  راية (rayah), meaning banner.
It is also said to be a Hebrew name meaning friend.
It is also said to be a Hindi name meaning flow.
In Indonesia and Malaysia, the term refers to greatness. The phrase raya hari is used to refer to a big celebration. The word is also associated in that region with rajah, a term used for nobility in India and related cultures.

Raya is also a Galician and Spanish surname that has been said to be derived from a place name or a term referring to a border.
It is also a masculine given name in different cultures, including the Philippines.

Usage
Raya was among the ten most popular names given to newborn girls in Bulgaria in 2021. It debuted among the 1,000 most popular names for newborn girls in the United States in 2020 and was among the 500 most popular names for American newborn girls in 2021. It was noted as a name that had greatly increased in usage there. The increased popularity of the name has been attributed to the release of the 2021 animated film Raya and the Last Dragon.

Men
Raya Martin (born 1984), Filipino filmmaker

Women
Raya, Egyptian serial killer
Raya Dunayevskaya (1910–1987), Russian-born American Marxist philosopher and humanist activist
Raya Haffar El Hassan, Lebanese politician
Raya Meddine, American actress of Lebanese descent
Raya Zeineddine (born 1988), Syrian sports shooter

Notes

Arabic feminine given names
Bulgarian feminine given names
Filipino masculine given names
Hebrew feminine given names
Russian feminine given names
Feminine given names